Tomasz Markowski (born 30 July 1975) is a Polish chess Grandmaster.

Chess career 
He won the Polish Chess Championship in 1993, 1998, 1999, 2003, and 2007. He also represented Poland five-times in Chess Olympiads. In 2000 he won a bronze medal at the European Individual Chess Championship in Saint-Vincent, Italy. Markowski won at Geneva (1995, 2000) and shared for fourth at the 2004 Aeroflot Open in Moscow.

Markowski was awarded the GM title in 1998.

Chess strength 
According to Chessmetrics his best single performance was at POL-ch 60th Warsaw, 2003, where he scored 10,5 of 13 possible points (81%) against 2520-rated opposition, for a performance rating of 2700.

In September 2009, FIDE list his Elo rating is 2632. His peak rating was 2610 on the July and October 2003 rating lists. He has been in the top 100 players in the world twice.  In July 2003 he was ranked 87th in the world, and on the October 2003 list he was 88th.

Notable games 
Tomasz Markowski vs Joel Lautier, 2nd IECC Playoff g/15 2001, King's Indian Attack: Double Fianchetto (A07), 1–0
Ilya Smirin vs Tomasz Markowski, Aeroflot Open 2002, Sicilian Defense: Kan, Wing Attack Fianchetto Variation (B43), 0–1
Tomasz Markowski vs Sergei Movsesian, Bermuda-A 2003, King's Indian Attack: Double Fianchetto (A07), 1–0
Tomasz Markowski vs Lorenz Maximilian Drabke, 5th Individual European Chess Championship 2004, Formation: King's Indian Attack (A07), 1–0

References

External links 

Tomasz Markowski player profile at Chessmetrics

1975 births
Living people
People from Głogów
Chess grandmasters
Polish chess players
Sportspeople from Lower Silesian Voivodeship